Meinhard is a community in the Werra-Meißner-Kreis in Hesse, Germany. It is also a masculine Germanic given name.

Meinhard may refer to:

Medieval people 
 Saint Meinhard (12th-century–1196), bishop of Livonia
 Meinhard I of Gorizia-Tyrol (1200/1205–1258), Count of Gorizia and Count of Tyrol
 Meinhard, Duke of Carinthia (1238–1295), Count of Gorizia and Count of Tyrol
 Meinhard III of Gorizia-Tyrol (1344–1363), Duke of Upper Bavaria and the last Count of Tyrol from the House of Wittelsbach

Modern people 
 Meinhard E. Mayer (1929–2011), Romanian professor of physics and mathematics at the University of California, Irvine
 Meinhard Nehmer (born 1941), retired East German bobsledder
 Meinhard Hemp (born 1942), retired German footballer

See also 
 Meinhardt (disambiguation)
 Mainard
 Maynard (given name)

Germanic masculine given names